The 1983 Miller High Life 500 was a NASCAR Winston Cup Series racing event that took place at Charlotte Motor Speedway in Concord, North Carolina on October 9, 1983.

Background
The race was held in Concord, North Carolina at Charlotte Motor Speedway, a  quad-oval paved track. The race was the second to be held at the track during the 1983 Winston Cup Series, with the other being the 1983 World 600. Bruton Smith and Curtis Turner began building the track in 1959, and despite numerous delays, the track was finished in 1960 for the inaugural World 600.

Race report
There were 40 drivers on the grid; 39 of them were American while Trevor Boys was the only Canadian. Sterling Marlin would rack up a last-place finish due to an engine failure on lap 53 out of the 334 being raced that day. Richard Petty defeated Darrell Waltrip by 3.1 seconds in front of 118,000 spectators in a time of three hours and thirty-four minutes; making him have 94 more wins than the next driver on the all-time wins list. There were 30 different lead changes and eight caution periods for 35 laps.

Richmond led 99 laps in the race and finished in fifth-place. The race developed a sudden and chaotic turn of events on lap 184, Darrell Waltrip managed to keep the lead for an entire lap on a field of speedy drivers before being overtaken by Bill Elliott in time for lap 185.

J.D. McDuffie would fail to qualify for this race along with Laurent Rioux (#38), Bosco Lowe, Randy Baker and Travis Tiller.

On the day of the race, 0.11 inches of precipitation were recorded around the speedway.

Following the last caution flag and pit stops of the race, Darrell Waltrip, driving Junior Johnson's #11 Chevy led the race over Tim Richmond in the #27 Raymond Beadle Pontiac after the restart with 23 laps to go. Richard Petty was in third place. With less than ten laps to go Waltrip's car noticeably slowed and appeared to wiggle slightly exiting turn two and allowed Petty to duck below for the lead and race win. Cale Yarborough in the #28 Ranier Racing Chevy was two laps down and also passed Waltrip and was on Petty's rear bumper when the checkered flag fell. The race highlights are available to view on YouTube. No direct link is allowed.

During victory lane celebrations a NASCAR official noticed that Petty's race car had left side tires mounted on the right side of the car, which was a violation of the rules. NASCAR sent Petty's Pontiac into the enclosed Union 76 garage inspection area for a complete engine teardown and detailed inspection.

After a four-hour inspection of the Petty Enterprises race car, NASCAR determined the engine in Petty's car was over the limit in cubic inches as specified in the rule book. The Petty team was penalized 104 points and fined $35,000 for the rule violations involving the tires and engine.

Petty co-crew chiefs, Robin Pemberton and Larry Pollard, stated that during the last pit stop of the race they put softer compound bias-ply tires designed for the left side of the cars on the right side of Petty's race car. The softer left side tires provided more traction when attached to the right side of a stock car and worked best when used during cool cloudy weather days which prevents the softer tires from quickly wearing out if mounted on the right side of the cars.

NASCAR allowed the win to stand because the second place car of Waltrip was quickly removed from the track in the team hauler rig after the race ended and could not be inspected to determine if it was legal or not. NASCAR stated that they wanted fans to leave the track knowing who won the race.

Ironically, ten years earlier at this race the winning Chevy of Cale Yarborough (owned by Junior Johnson) and Richard Petty's second place Dodge were both submitted to long inspections after the race for allegedly having oversized engines. NASCAR admitted in the days after the 1973 race controversy that their pre-race inspection system needed to be improved.

This was the 198th race win in Petty's career.  The total amount of prize money offered to all NASCAR Winston Cup Series drivers for this race was a then-incredible $352,430. and was one of the top paying races of the 1983 season.

Top 10 finishers

Standings after the race

References

Miller High Life 500
Miller High Life 500
NASCAR races at Charlotte Motor Speedway
NASCAR controversies